Granogue is an unincorporated community in New Castle County, Delaware, United States. Granogue is located along Smiths Bridge Road, west of the Brandywine Creek and south of the Pennsylvania border.

References 

Unincorporated communities in New Castle County, Delaware
Unincorporated communities in Delaware